Raipura is a town which comes under the jurisdiction of Panna district, Madhya Pradesh, India. It is one of the nine tehsils of Panna. It is about 113 km from the district headquarters. It is surrounded by Damoh and Katni districts.

The nearest district headquarters of Katni is 50 KM away from Raipura.  It shares borders with Rithi tehsil to the east, Bahoriband tehsil to the south, Patera tehsil to the north west, and Pawai tehsil to the north east.

Geography 
Raipura village is located in 'Raipura Tehsil' of 'Panna' district in 'Madhya Pradesh', India. It is situated 113 KM away from the district headquarters of Panna. 

As per 2009 stats, Raipura village is also a Gram Panchayat. According to Census 2011 information the location code of Raipura village is 459544. The total geographical area of village is 1,720.48 hectares.

Demographics

Total Population 

Raipura has a total population of 5,426 which includes:

Males: 2,817

Females: 2,609

Population in the age-group 0-6:

Total: 842;

Male: 450;

Female: 392

Number of Total Houses 
There are about 1,280 houses in Raipura village.

2011 Census Data on Raipura:

Literacy 
Raipura has almost 3,404 literates including 1,988 Males and 1,416 Females.

There are 2,022 illiterates including 829 Males and 1,193 females.

Transportation 
Available means of Public transportation includes Bus and Train (via Salaiya Railway). Some Auto rickshaws can also be expected in some of the areas.

State Highways SH14 and SH51 pass through the town, where the busses for Katni, Jabalpur, Damoh, Sagar, Indore, Panna, and Tikamgarh are available.

Civic Administration

Tahshil 
There are 109 villages  under the jurisdiction of Raipura Tahsil.

Total Number of Households:
20,062

Percentage distribution of Households

Permanent: 2,933 (14.61%)

Semi-permanent: 13,404 (66.76%)

Temporary: 3,725 (18.55%)

Gram Panchayat 
The Gram Panchayat Raipura is charged with governance of the town's civic and infrastructural assets. Mamta Jain is Sarpanch of current panchvarsi, Since 2022.

Major Places 

1. Jhanda Chowk: Situated in the Heart of Raipura, Jhanda Chowk is one of the popular and old places in Raipura. It is a center of all public meetings, public events and festival celebration.

2. Sankat Mochan Dham: "Sankat Mochan = Hanuman" and "Dham = Place". Literal Meaning 'Place of Lord Hanuman'

3. Trigadda (Three Ways Center):

4. Foota: It is also referred to as Sanjay Nagar.

Education

Schools 
The town hosts schools including:-
 Govt. Higher Secondary School 
 Saraswati Gyan Mandir
 Seth Sukhai Lal Shishu Vidya Mandir
 Saraswati Shishu Mandir (Shri Ram Shiksha Dwara Sanchalit)
 Jodhan Singh School (English Medium)

College 
A private college named Rajiv Gandhi College is situated in the town.

Economy 
The economy is mainly based on agriculture.

References

Villages in Panna district